

England
Aston Hill Mountain Bike Area
Bedgebury Forest
Cannock Chase
Dalby Forest
Esher Shore
Eastridge Woods Trail Center
Exmoor
Cannop Cycle Centre, Forest of Dean
Guisborough
Hamsterley
Lee Quarry, Bacup
Penshurst Off Road Cycling (AKA PORC), Kent
Quantock Hills
Queen Elizabeth Country Park, Petersfield, Hampshire
Rowney Warren Mountain Biking
Stainburn
Swinley Forest
Wharncliffe Woods, north of Sheffield, Yorkshire

Scotland
7stanes
Nevis Range, near Fort William

Wales
Afan Argoed
Coed-y-Brenin
Cwm Carn
Brecon Beacons National Park
Llandegla Forest
Llangynog
 The Marin Trail, in Gwydir Forest

See also
 Mountain biking in the United Kingdom

Mountain biking venues in the United Kingdom